The 9th Chess Olympiad, organized by the FIDE and comprising an open team tournament, as well as several events designed to promote the game of chess, took place between August 20 and September 11, 1950, in Dubrovnik, FPR Yugoslavia (present day Croatia). Eighty-four players from 16 nations played a total of 480 games.  The acclaimed 1950 Dubrovnik chess set  was designed and manufactured specifically for the Olympiad.

Results

Team standings

{| class="wikitable"
! # !!Country !! Players !! Points
|-
| style="background:gold;"|1 ||  || Gligorić, Pirc, Trifunović, Rabar, Vidmar Jr., Puc || 45½
|-
| style="background:silver;"|2 ||  || Najdorf, Bolbochán Jul., Guimard, Rossetto, Pilnik || 43½
|-
| style="background:#cc9966;"|3 ||  || Unzicker, Schmid, Pfeiffer, Rellstab, Staudte || 40½
|-
| 4 ||  || Reshevsky, Steiner, Horowitz, Shainswit, Kramer G., Evans || 40
|-
| 5 ||  || Euwe, van Scheltinga, Prins, Cortlever, Kramer H., Donner|| 37
|-
| 6 ||  || O'Kelly, Dunkelblum, Devos, Thibaut, Van Schoor || 32
|-
| 7 ||  || Beni, Busek, Müller, Palda, Lambert || 31½
|-
| 8 ||  || Castillo, Flores, Letelier, Maccioni || 30½
|-
| 9 ||  || Tartakower, Rossolimo, Hugot, Kesten, Chaudé de Silans, Crépeaux || 28½
|-
| 10 ||  || Böök, Ojanen, Niemi, Niemelä, Helle, Heikinheimo || 28
|-
| 11 ||  || Sköld, Johansson, Bergkvist A., Bergkvist N., Lindquist, Stenborg || 27½
|-
| 12 ||  || Castaldi, Nestler, Porreca, Giustolisi, Primavera || 25
|-
| 13 ||  || Poulsen, Enevoldsen, Pedersen, Kupferstich, Nielsen || 22
|-
| 14 ||  || Canal, Súmar, Zapata, Pinzón Solis || 21½
|-
| 15 ||  || Myhre, Vestøl, Morcken, Kongshavn, Opsahl || 15
|-
| 16 ||  || Mastihiadis, Panagopoulos, Zografakis, Boulahanis, Othoneos || 12
|}

Team results

Individual medals

The prizes for best individual results went to:

 Board 1:  Miguel Najdorf and  Wolfgang Unzicker 11 / 14 = 78.6%
 Board 2:  Julio Bolbochán 11½ / 14 = 82.1%
 Board 3:  Petar Trifunović 10 / 13 = 76.9%
 Board 4:  Braslav Rabar 9 / 10 = 90.0%
 1st reserve:  Hermann Pilnik 7½ / 10 = 75.0%
 2nd reserve:  Larry Evans 9 / 10 = 90.0%

References

09
Olympiad 09
Chess Olympiad 09
Olympiad 09
Olympiad 09
Chess Olympiad 09